Sheffield Olympic Legacy Park Community Stadium is a stadium built at the Sheffield Olympic Legacy Park. It occupies part of the site of the former Don Valley Stadium.

The Stadium was completed in January 2022, and features a three-storey, covered stand having capacity for up to 3,900 spectators alongside 23,000 sq ft of business space and ancillary facilities. 

It is the home ground of Sheffield Eagles.

History
On 11 January 2013, Sheffield City Council announced that the Don Valley stadium was to be closed and demolished as part of a £50 million budget-cutting measure. An eleventh hour meeting was held at Sheffield Town Hall on 1 March 2013. Local and national politicians met to discuss the proposed closure and any possibility of preventing it. A final decision was made that the stadium was to close in September 2013 and would be demolished from 21 November 2013.

In October 2014, it was announced that the Olympic Legacy Park would be constructed on the site of the old Don Valley Stadium. It was to contain an Advanced Wellbeing Research Centre, an indoor sports arena, a sports pitch and stadium to be home of the Sheffield Eagles, Oasis Academy and University Technical College (UTC). The college, which costed £10 million and is backed by Sheffield College and Sheffield Hallam University, opened in 2016.

On 11 March 2018, the Sheffield Eagles finally made a long-awaited return to Sheffield, after spells playing in Doncaster, Rotherham and Wakefield. The first competitive sporting event played at the OLP ended in a 10-44 loss to the Toronto Wolfpack. This was after the scheduled first game against the London Broncos was postponed due to bad weather conditions. 

They were joined later in the year by Sheffield United W.F.C. who played their first game at the stadium on 4 December 2018.  Although they changed their plans and moved to Chesterfield FC's Technique Stadium in 2019.

In 2021 American Football team Sheffield Giants also began playing their home games at the stadium.

Construction works started on the Community Stadium in February 2021 and are due to be completed in February 2022.

References

Football venues in Sheffield
Rugby league stadiums in England